Stefanie Beck is a Canadian public servant and diplomat. She has been serving as the  Deputy Minister of Agriculture and Agri-Food Canada (AAFC) since February 20, 2023. She was previously Associate Deputy Minister of National Defence and Deputy High Commissioner for Canada to the United Kingdom.

Life and career 
She joined the Department of External Affairs in 1990. She has served abroad as a political officer in Dakar, Senegal, and Canberra, Australia, and she was Ambassador to Cambodia from 2002 to 2004 and Ambassador to Croatia from 2004 to 2006.

In Ottawa, she has worked on Central and Eastern Europe Relations and on Japan, and she was Deputy Director for United Nations. Upon her return to Ottawa in August 2006, she became Director, Security and Defence Relations. She was Senior Departmental Adviser to the Minister of Foreign Affairs from September 2007 to September 2008, where she served two ministers and managed three transition periods. She has a BA in German and Italian from McGill University, graduating in 1987.

Beck is currently the Associate Deputy Minister at the Department of National Defence (DND). Previously, she served as Canada's Deputy High Commissioner to the United Kingdom of Great Britain and Northern Ireland and Alternate Representative to the International Maritime Organization, having been appointed to the role in October 2020. In early 2021, she served as the Acting High Commissioner after Janice Charette left the post to serve as interim Clerk of the Privy Council. Previously, she was Assistant Secretary to Cabinet, Priorities and Planning at the Privy Council Office. She was also Assistant Deputy Minister (ADM) of Europe, Middle East, Maghreb, and Circumpolar Affairs at Global Affairs Canada (GAC) from August 2017 to October 2018 and ADM of Corporate Services from December 2013 to August 2017. She joined Immigration, Refugees and Citizenship Canada (IRCC) from the Department of Foreign Affairs, Trade and Development, where she had been Acting ADM of the International Platform Branch, which runs Canada's diplomatic missions abroad. At IRCC, she was responsible for Human Resources, IM / IT, Security, Accommodation and Procurement, as well as Corporate Affairs. She was also IRCC's Official Languages Champion. From December 2015 to March 2016 she joined the team leading the successful Syria refugee operation.

Prior to that, Beck was Director General for the Foreign Service Directives Services and Policy Bureau from September 2008 to August 2010, overseeing final negotiations and implementation of the new Foreign Service Directives, after which she took on responsibility for common service operations at all missions abroad, including the Regional Service Centres, with a budget of over $240 million. She also managed the governance structure of the International Platform Branch for all of its clients. The combination of this experience, in addition to her extensive work implementing budget cuts and many other corporate priorities, has given her a deep knowledge and appreciation for clients' business needs, as well as the operating environment and the resources available to deliver those needs abroad.

Awards 
 In 2015, Beck received the Deputy Minister's Award for Operation Syrian Refugees.
 In 2009, Beck received the Public Service Award of Excellence for Afghanistan.

References

External links 

 A chat with Stefanie Beck – Global Affairs Canada
 Biography of Stefanie Beck – Department of National Defence (Canada)

Canadian women ambassadors
McGill University alumni
1960s births
Living people
Ambassadors of Canada to Cambodia
Ambassadors of Canada to Croatia